Ekman is a Swedish surname. Notable people with the surname include:

Carl Gustaf Ekman (1872–1945), Swedish politician
Carl Daniel Ekman (1845–1904), Swedish chemical engineer
Erik Leonard Ekman (1883–1931), Swedish botanist
Fam Ekman (born 1946), Swedish-Norwegian children's writer and illustrator
Gösta Ekman (junior) (1939–2017), Swedish actor
Gösta Ekman (senior) (1890–1938) Swedish actor
Hasse Ekman (1915–2004), Swedish film director and actor
Hedda Ekman (1860–1929), Swedish writer and photographer
Ida Ekman (1875–1942), Finnish soprano
Kajsa Ekis Ekman, (born 1980), Swedish journalist and writer
Kerstin Ekman (born 1933), Swedish novelist
Nils Ekman (born 1976), Swedish ice hockey player
Paul Ekman (born 1934), American psychologist
Robert Wilhelm Ekman (1808–1873), Finnish painter
Sheldon V. Ekman (1920–1982), United States Tax Court judge
Sven P. Ekman (1876–1964), Swedish zoologist
Ulf Ekman (born 1950), Swedish clergyman
Vagn Walfrid Ekman (1874–1954), Swedish oceanographer

See also
Ekman layer
Ekman spiral
Ekman current meter
Ekman transport
Ekman number
Ekman water bottle
Eckman (disambiguation)
Eckmann, a surname

Swedish-language surnames